Agaricus angusticystidiatus is a species of fungus in the family Agaricaceae. It has a diameter of 40–80 mm and is found in Southeast Asia.

References 

angusticystidiatus

Fungi described in 2018
Fungi of Asia